A total lunar eclipse took place on Friday, August 6, 1971, the second of two total lunar eclipses in 1971. A dramatic total eclipse lasting 1 hour, 39 minutes and 24.8 seconds plunged the full Moon into deep darkness, as it passed right through the centre of the Earth's umbral shadow. While the visual effect of a total eclipse is variable, the Moon may have been stained a deep orange or red colour at maximum eclipse. This was a great spectacle for everyone who saw it. The partial eclipse lasted for 3 hours, 35 minutes and 31.9 seconds in total. Ocurring only 2.2 days before perigee (Perigee on Monday, August 9, 1971), the Moon's apparent diameter was 3.6% larger than average and the moon passed through the center of the Earth's shadow.

Visibility
It was completely visible over Africa and Asia, rising over South America, and setting over Australia.

Relation to other lunar eclipses

Lunar year series

Saros series 

Lunar Saros 128 contains 15 total lunar eclipses between 1845 and 2097 (in years 1845, 1863, 1881, 1899, 1917, 1935, 1953, 1971, 1989, 2007, 2025, 2043, 2061, 2079 and 2097). Solar Saros 135 interleaves with this lunar saros with an event occurring every 9 years 5 days alternating between each saros series.

Inex series

Half-Saros cycle
A lunar eclipse will be preceded and followed by solar eclipses by 9 years and 5.5 days (a half saros). This lunar eclipse is related to two annular solar eclipses of Solar Saros 135.

See also
List of lunar eclipses
List of 20th-century lunar eclipses

Notes

External links

1971-08
1971-08
1971 in science
August 1971 events